Sandrabatis crassiella is a moth of the family Pyralidae first described by Émile Louis Ragonot in 1893. It is found in Japan and probably in Sri Lanka.

References

External links
Taxonomic review of the genus Indomyrlaea Roesler & Küppers 1979 of China, with descriptions of five new species

Moths of Asia
Moths described in 1893
Phycitini
Taxa named by Émile Louis Ragonot